Azamgarh is a city in the Indian state of Uttar Pradesh. It is the headquarters of Azamgarh division, which consists of Ballia, Mau and Azamgarh districts. Azamgarh is situated on the bank of Tamsa River (Tons).

History

Azamgarh, one of the easternmost districts(a district in Purvanchal sub-region) of Uttar Pradesh, once formed a part of the ancient Kosala kingdom, except its north-eastern part.

The district is named after its headquarters town, Azamgarh, which was founded in 1665 by Azam, son of Vikramajit. Vikramajit was a descendant of Gautam Rajputs of Mehnagar in Pargana Nizamabad who like some of his predecessors had embraced the faith of Islam. He had a Muslim wife who bore him two sons Azam and Azmat. While Azam gave his name to the town of Azamgarh, and the fort, Azmat constructed the fort and settled the bazaar of Azmatgarh pargana Sagri.  After the attack of Chabile Ram, Azmat Khan fled northwards followed by the interior forces. He attempted to cross the Ghaghra into Gorakhpur, but the people on the other side opposed his landing, and he was either shot in mid stream or was drowned in attempting to escape by swimming.

In 1688 A.D. during Azmat's lifetime, his eldest son Ekram took part in the management of the state, and after Azam's death he was perhaps left in possession together with Mohhabat, another son. The remaining two sons were taken away and for a time detained as hostages for their brothers' 'good behaviour'.

The successor of Ikram finally confirmed the title of his family to the Jamidari. Ikram left no heirs and was succeeded by Iradat, son of Mohhabat. But the real ruler all along had been Mohhabat, and after Ikram's death, he continued to rule in his son's name.

Geography 
Azamgarh has an average elevation of 64 metres (209 feet). The district consists of a series of parallel ridges, whose summits are depressed into beds or hollows, along which the rivers flow; while between the ridges are low-lying rice lands, interspersed with numerous natural reservoirs. The soil is fertile, and very highly cultivated, bearing good crops of rice, sugarcane, and wheat and orchards of mango and guava. Maize, gram, corn, mustard are other major crops

Climate
Azamgarh experiences a humid subtropical climate (Köppen climate classification Cwa) with large variations between summer and winter temperatures. Summers are long, from early April to October with intervening monsoon seasons, and are also extremely hot, even by South Asian standards. Winters in Azamgarh see very large diurnal variations, with warm days and downright cold nights. Cold waves from the Himalayan region cause temperatures to dip across the city in the winter from December to February and temperatures below  are not uncommon. Fog is common in the winters, while hot dry winds, called loo, blow in the summers. In recent years, the water level of the Tamsa has decreased significantly.

Demographics
As per the 2011 census, Azamgarh urban agglomeration had a population of 110,983, out of which males were 57,878, and females were 53,105.

Literacy
The average literacy rate of Azamgarh town in 2011 was 70.93%, compared to 56.95% in 2001. Male and female literacy were 81.34% and 60.91% respectively. For the 2001 census, In Azamgarh district. the corresponding figures were 71.04% and 43.40%.

Religion

Languages

At the time of the 2011 Census of India, 45.22% of the population recorded Hindi as their first language, while 37.46% recorded Bhojpuri and 16.99% Urdu.

Transport

Road

Azamgarh is connected with Lucknow  and Delhi  by road. It has one of the biggest bus depots in eastern Uttar Pradesh and regular bus services to almost all district headquarters of Uttar Pradesh and also to Delhi.

Train
Azamgarh station is one of the most important of eastern Uttar Pradesh. Azamgarh is directly connected to Delhi by Kaifiyat Express, to Mumbai by Mumbai LTT – Azamgarh Weekly Express, Godaan express, to Ahmedabad, the state capital Lucknow, Jaipur, Ajmer, and Amritsar, to Kolkata by KOAA AMH Express (13137).

Air
The airport is under construction and not yet open.

Education
Azamgarh has a number of educational institutions ranging from basic educational institutions to the higher institution. There are a number of ITIs, Polytechnics, Nursing Schools, and medical college. Notable institutions include:

 Azamgarh State University, established in 2019
 Government Medical College and Super Facility Hospital, Azamgarh is a state medical college located at Chakrapanpur, Azamgarh.
 Rajkiya Engineering College, Azamgarh is a government engineering college and a constituent college of Dr. A.P.J. Abdul Kalam Technical University (formerly Uttar Pradesh Technical University).
 Shibli National College offers graduate and postgraduate courses in Azamgarh. Its well known institution established in 1883 by Shibli Nomani, an Islamic scholar from Indian subcontinent during British Raj.

Media

FM
 Voice Of Azamgarh (90.8) Community Radio.
 Air Vividh Bharti (102.2) which Broadcast from Azamgarh City & Covers Bilariaganj city too.
Half Lemon Radio (90.4)
 Ullu TV - YouTube run by Rajiv Talvar a famous youtuber

Notable people

Azmi is a common toponymic surname among Indian Muslims from Azamgarh.
Iqbal Abdulla (born 1989), Indian cricketer
Abdul Haq Azmi (1928–2016), Indian Islamic scholar, cousin-uncle of Rana Ayyub
Abdul Lateef Azmi (1917–2002), Indian Urdu writer
Abu Azmi (born 1955), Indian politician, MLA from Maharashtra and former Member of Rajya Sabha
Ahmad Ali Barqi Azmi (born 1954), Indian Urdu poet
Azizullah Azmi (1929–2010), Indian politician, MP of Lok Sabha
Baba Azmi, Indian film cinematographer, husband of Tanvi Azmi
Habib al-Rahman al-'Azmi (1901-1992), Indian Islamic scholar of hadith and fiqh 
Iliyas Azmi (born 1934), Indian politician, MP of Lok Sabha
Kaifi Azmi (1919–2002) was an Indian Urdu poet, husband of Shaukat Azmi and father of Shabana Azmi
Khaleel-Ur-Rehman Azmi (1927–1978), Indian Urdu poet and literary critic 
Mohammed Badi Uzzaman Azmi (1939–2011), British-Pakistani television and film actor
Muhammad Mustafa Azmi (1930–2017), Indian Islamic scholar of hadith
Mushtaq Ahmed Azmi (1919–2011), Indian adult educationist and UNESCO official
Obaidullah Khan Azmi (born 1949), Indian politician, MP of Rajya Sabha
Seema Azmi, Indian actress of film and stage
Shahid Azmi (1977–2010), Indian human rights lawyer
Shakeel Azmi (born 1971), Indian Urdu lyricist and poet
Waqar Azmi (born 1970), British-Indian civil servant
Shaikh Shamim Ahmed Azmi (1938–2019), former MLA and Indian National Congress leader from Mumbai
Qamaruzzaman Azmi (born 1946), Indian Islamic scholar
Mirza Aslam Beg (born 1931), former Chief of Army Staff of Pakistan
Praveen Dubey (born 1993), Indian cricketer
Amin Ahsan Islahi (1904–1997), Pakistani Islamic scholar, famous for his Urdu exegeses of Quran, Tadabbur-i-Qur'an
Sadruddin Islahi (1917 - 1998) was an Indian Islamic Urdu writer and a close companion of Abul A'la Maududi. He was one of the early members of Jamat e Islami.
Frank F Islam, American entrepreneur, civic leader and writer. General Trustee of the Board of Trustees of the John F. Kennedy Center for the Performing Arts in 2013
Kanhaiya Lal Misra (1903–1975), Indian lawyer and independence activist, Advocate General of Uttar Pradesh from 1952 to 1969
Saeed-ur-Rahman Azmi Nadvi (born 1934), Indian Islamic scholar
Shibli Nomani (1857–1914) Indian Islamic scholar, historian, educationist and social reformer
Prem Chand Pandey, Indian scientist, founder-director National Centre for Antarctic and Ocean Research
Shaukat Hussain Rizvi, filmmaker in India and Pakistan
Ahmad Salahuddin (1937-1996), Indian biochemist, Founder Director of Interdisciplinary Biotechnology Unit at AMU in 1984.
Rahul Sankrityayan (1893–1963), Indian writer, known as the father of Hindi travelogue
Amar Singh (1956–2020), Indian politician former MP
Gajendra Singh, Indian television producer
Prakash Singh, Indian Police Service officer, who rose to the highest rank of Director General of Police (DGP).
Vinod K. Singh (born 1959), Indian chemist, director Indian Institute of Science Education and Research, Bhopal, professor IIT Kanpur
Iqbal Suhail (1884–1955), Indian Urdu poet
Ayodhya Prasad Upadhyay (1865–1947), Indian writer, essayist, scholar, poet in Hindi
Ram Naresh Yadav (1928–2016) Indian politician, Chief Minister of Uttar Pradesh from 1977 to 1979
Ramakant Yadav (born 1957), Indian politician, MP of Lok Sabha

See also
 Azamgarh alcohol poisonings
 List of cities in Uttar Pradesh
 Dewait
 Kohanda

Notes

References

External links 

 Uttar Pradesh Assembly Elections
 Azamgarh Assembly Elections
 District Website

 
Cities and towns in Azamgarh district
Populated places established in 1665
1665 establishments in India
Cities in Uttar Pradesh